Kyohei Inukai (1886-1954) was a Japanese-American artist who painted portraits and watercolors during the early part of the twentieth century. Inukai received the Maynard Prize in 1926 from the National Academy of Design.

In 1925, his self-portrait was exhibited at the National Academy of Design in New York and the Pennsylvania Academy of the Fine Arts in Philadelphia. Currently the portrait is in the National Museum of Modern Art, Tokyo.

Other notable exhibitions, include a 2014 show at the museum at Amherst which paired Inukai's work with portraiture by Robert Brackman.

See also
Kyohei Inukai (b 1913)

References

Further reading

External links
Press release regarding an exhibition of his work and publication of autobiography in 2013

American portrait painters
American watercolorists
1886 births
1954 deaths
American artists of Japanese descent
20th-century American painters
American male painters
20th-century American male artists